Dwikhondito is a 2019 Indian Bengali film directed by Nabarun Sen. This was Sen's directorial debut film. The film tells a story of a writer suffering from Dissociative identity disorder.  Saayoni Ghosh played role of a  psychiatrist.

Cast 
 Saswata Chatterjee
 Soumitra Chatterjee
 Koushik Kar
 Saayoni Ghosh
 Anjana Basu
 Partha D Mitra
 Tanima Das Sarkar

References

External links
 

2019 directorial debut films
2019 films
Bengali-language Indian films
2010s Bengali-language films
2019 psychological thriller films